James Wright Robertson (20 February 1929 – 11 June 2015) was a Scottish professional footballer who played as a winger.

Career
Robertson joined Arsenal in 1948, making one appearance for them in the 1951–52 season. He later played for Brentford, before playing non-league football with Gravesend & Northfleet.

References

Scottish footballers
Arsenal F.C. players
Brentford F.C. players
Ebbsfleet United F.C. players
English Football League players
Footballers from Falkirk
1929 births
2015 deaths
Southern Football League players
Association football wingers